The CEV qualification for the 2014 FIVB Volleyball Women's World Championship saw member nations compete for nine places at the finals in Italy. The two best-ranked teams from the 2013 Women's European Volleyball Championship, plus seven teams from the qualification tournaments qualify for the World Championship.

European Championship

 Eliminated in third qualification round

 
 
 

 Eliminated in second qualification round

 
 
 
 
 
 
 
 
 
 
 
 

 Eliminated in first qualification round

Draw
41 CEV national teams entered qualification. The teams were distributed according to their position in the CEV Senior Women's Confederation Rankings as of 1 January 2013 using the serpentine system for their distribution. (Rankings shown in brackets) Pools composition was determined by taking into consideration – as far as possible – the geographical location of the various countries. Teams ranked 1–12 do not compete in the first and second rounds, and automatically qualify for the third round. (Russia and Germany later qualified through European Championship)

First round

Second round

Third round

The twenty remaining teams were distributed according to their position in the CEV Senior Women's Confederation Rankings as of 1 January 2013 using the serpentine system for their distribution. (Rankings shown in brackets)

First round

Pool A
Venue:  Sportski Centar Igalo, Herceg Novi, Montenegro
Dates: May 24–26, 2013
All times are Central European Summer Time (UTC+02:00)

|}

|}

Pool B
Venue:  SK Olimpiets, Mogilev, Belarus
Dates: May 24–26, 2013
All times are Eastern European Summer Time (UTC+03:00)

|}

|}

Pool C
Venue:  Sportcampus Lange Munte, Kortrijk, Belgium
Dates: May 23–26, 2013
All times are Central European Summer Time (UTC+02:00)

|}

|}

Pool D
Venue:  Sporting Complex of Regional Sports School, Lutsk, Ukraine
Dates: May 24–26, 2013
All times are Eastern European Summer Time (UTC+03:00)

|}

|}

Pool E
Venue:  Aréna Poprad, Poprad, Slovakia
Dates: May 24–26, 2013
All times are Central European Summer Time (UTC+02:00)

|}

|}

Pool F
Venue:  Olympic Sports Centre, Daugavpils, Latvia
Dates: May 24–26, 2013
All times are Eastern European Summer Time (UTC+03:00)

|}

|}

Pool G
Venue:  Cottonera Sports Complex, Cospicua, Malta
Dates: June 28–30, 2013
All times are Central European Summer Time (UTC+02:00)

|}

|}

Second round

Pool H
Venue:  Metrowest Sport Palace, Ra'anana, Israel
Dates: October 2–6, 2013
All times are Israel Daylight Time (UTC+03:00)

|}

|}

Third round

Pool I
Venue:  Başkent Volleyball Hall, Ankara, Turkey
Dates: January 3–5, 2014
All times are Eastern European Time (UTC+02:00)

|}

|}

Pool J
Venue:  A.Y.S. Sport Hall, Baku, Azerbaijan
Dates: January 3–5, 2014
All times are Azerbaijan Time (UTC+04:00)

|}

|}

Pool K
Venue:  Atlas Arena, Łódź, Poland
Dates: January 3–5, 2014
All times are Central European Time (UTC+01:00)

|}

|}

Pool L
Venue:  Dvorana Gimnasium, Rovinj, Croatia
Dates: January 3–5, 2014
All times are Central European Time (UTC+01:00)

|}

|}

Pool M
Venue:  Arena Samokov, Samokov, Bulgaria
Dates: January 3–5, 2014
All times are Eastern European Time (UTC+02:00)

|}

|}

Second placed teams

|}

References

2014 FIVB Volleyball Women's World Championship
2013 in women's volleyball
2014 in women's volleyball
FIVB Volleyball World Championship qualification